The 2000 European Junior Judo Championships is an edition of the European Junior Judo Championships, organised by the International Judo Federation. It was held in Nicosia, Cyprus from 8 to 10 December 2000.

Medal summary

Medal table

Men's events

Women's events

Source Results

References

External links
 

 U21
European Junior Judo Championships
European Championships, U21
Judo
Judo in Cyprus
Judo
Judo, European Championships U21